Sediliopsis gracilis is an extinct species of sea snail, a marine gastropod mollusk in the family Pseudomelatomidae, the turrids and allies.

Description

Distribution
Fossils of this species were found in Miocene strata of Maryland, USA; age range: 11.608 to 5.332 Ma.

References

 E. J. Petuch. 1988. Neogene History of Tropical American Mollusks 1-217

External links
 Don I. Tippett, Taxonomic notes on the western Atlantic Turridae (Gastropoda: Conoidea); the Nautilus v. 109 (1995-1996)
 E. Petuch (2009), Molluscan Paleontology of the Chesapeake Miocene

gracilis
Gastropods described in 1830